Gokarnamatam is a village in Nizampatnam mandal, located in Guntur district of Andhra Pradesh, India. It is a coastal area with a sea harbor nearby. The occupation of the people is mainly agriculture and fishing.

References

Villages in Guntur district